Albert Gerard "Bert" Koenders (born 28 May 1958) is a Dutch politician of the Labour Party (PvdA) who served as Minister of Foreign Affairs from 2014 to 2017. He is currently a professor at Leiden University and a special envoy of the World Bank. He is also a member of the board of trustees of the International Crisis Group and a commissioner of the International Commission on Missing Persons.

Koenders studied political science at the Vrije Universiteit Amsterdam and the University of Amsterdam, and completed a second master's in international relations at Johns Hopkins University. He was a member of the House of Representatives from 1997 to 2007 and served as Minister for Development Cooperation from 2007 until 2010. He later was the UN Secretary-General's Special Representative and Head of the United Nations Operation in the Ivory Coast (2011–2013), and Special Representative and Head of the United Nations Multidimensional Integrated Stabilization Mission in Mali (2013–2014). Koenders founded the Parliamentary Network on the World Bank/International Monetary Fund and has served as President of the North Atlantic Treaty Organization Parliamentary Assembly and leader of its Socialist Group.

Biography

Early life
Albert Gerard Koenders was born on 28 May 1958 in Arnhem in Gelderland, where he grew up in a Reformed environment. He was a boy scout. He attended the secondary school Carolus Clusius College in Zwolle, where he completed the pre-university program.

Koenders studied political science at the Free University Amsterdam (sitting his candidates examination in 1978) and political and social sciences (international relations and economics) at the University of Amsterdam (graduating in 1983). He received his Master of Arts degree from Johns Hopkins University, where he studied at the School of Advanced International Studies in Bologna and Washington from 1979 to 1981.

Koenders is not married.

Politics

Early career
Koenders was adjunct professor at Webster University in Leiden from 1987 to 1993. In 2002 he was visiting professor at Johns Hopkins University in Bologna teaching about conflict prevention and management, and post-conflict reconstruction. Due to his past experience of being a professor, he occasionally participates in lectures about specific aspects of political science at various universities around the Netherlands.

From 1983 to 1993, Koenders worked as an aide for the Labour Party in the House of Representatives. He served as an adviser to the United Nations Operation in Mozambique in the early 1990s, his first job outside the Netherlands. Between 1995 and 1997, he worked in the private office of Hans van den Broek, who was then the Dutch European commissioner and had shared responsibility for foreign policy. During that time, one of his tasks was defining the EU’s competences on foreign policy.

House of Representatives
Koenders was a member of the House of Representatives from 1997 until 2007. In 1997, he filled the vacant seat after member of parliament Maarten van Traa died in a car accident. He was member of the permanent parliamentary committees on foreign affairs and on defense. From 2002 until 2003 he was a member of the parliamentary hearing committee on the Srebrenica massacre. From 17 November 2006 to 19 February 2007 he was president of the NATO Parliamentary Assembly.

Minister of Development Cooperation
Koenders was minister without portfolio for Development Cooperation (Ministry of Foreign Affairs) in the Fourth Balkenende cabinet sworn in on 22 February 2007.

He came under political fire as minister in July 2007, after it became known that an event sponsored by the Ministry, Het akkoord van Schokland, was organized without a public procurement process stipulated under European Union law. Instead, the event was organized by an event bureau closely tied to the Labour Party itself. Koenders cited time shortage.

Between 2008 and 2009, Koenders was part of a High-Level Taskforce on Innovative International Financing for Health Systems, which had been launched to help strengthen health systems in the 49 poorest countries in the world and was chaired by UK Prime Minister Gordon Brown and World Bank president Robert Zoellick. In 2009, he criticized Pope Benedict XVI for his assertion that distributing condoms is not the solution to AIDS and actually makes the problem worse.

United Nations
Between 2011 and 2013, he served as the UN Secretary-General's Special Representative and Head of the United Nations Operation in the Ivory Coast.

Between 2013 and 2014, he was the Special Representative and Head of the United Nations Multidimensional Integrated Stabilization Mission in Mali appointed by UN Secretary-General Ban Ki-moon.

Minister of Foreign Affairs
On 17 October 2014, Koenders succeeded Frans Timmermans as Minister of Foreign Affairs.

At the 2016 United Nations Security Council election, Koenders and his Italian counterpart Paolo Gentiloni agreed on splitting a two-year term on the United Nations Security Council after the United Nations General Assembly was deadlocked on whether to choose Italy or the Netherlands following five rounds of voting for the last remaining 2017/18 seat.

In December 2016, Koenders summoned Sadık Arslan, Turkey's ambassador in the Netherlands, after the De Telegraaf newspaper reported that the Turkish embassy had sent home a list of Dutch Turks who might have sympathized with the failed coup.

Other activities
 International Crisis Group (ICG), Board of Trustees (since 2018)
 African Development Bank (AfDB), Ex-Officio Alternate Member of the Board of Governors (2007-2010)

Decorations

References

External links

Official
  Drs. A.G. (Bert) Koenders Parlement & Politiek

|-

|-

 
 

|-
 
 

|-

 

1958 births
Living people
Chevaliers of the Légion d'honneur
Academic staff of Leiden University
Dutch nonprofit directors
Dutch political consultants
Dutch officials of the United Nations
Grand Cordons of the Order of the Rising Sun
Johns Hopkins University faculty
Labour Party (Netherlands) politicians
Members of the House of Representatives (Netherlands)
Ministers for Development Cooperation of the Netherlands
Ministers of Foreign Affairs of the Netherlands
Officers of the Order of Orange-Nassau
Paul H. Nitze School of Advanced International Studies alumni
Politicians from Amsterdam
People from Arnhem
Recipients of the Order of the Volta
Reformed Churches Christians from the Netherlands
Special Representatives of the Secretary-General of the United Nations
University of Amsterdam alumni
Vrije Universiteit Amsterdam alumni
Webster University faculty
20th-century Dutch diplomats
20th-century Dutch politicians
21st-century Dutch diplomats
21st-century Dutch politicians